Jim O'Brien (2 August 1936 – 23 January 1996) was  a former Australian rules footballer who played with St Kilda in the Victorian Football League (VFL).

Notes

External links 
		

1936 births
1996 deaths
Australian rules footballers from Victoria (Australia)
St Kilda Football Club players
Old Xaverians Football Club players